The Constant Nymph is a 1933 British drama film directed by Basil Dean and starring Victoria Hopper, Brian Aherne and Leonora Corbett. It is an adaptation of the 1924 novel The Constant Nymph by Margaret Kennedy and the 1926 stage play adaptation written by Kennedy and Dean. Dean tried to persuade Novello to reprise his appearance from the 1928 silent version The Constant Nymph but was turned down and cast Aherne in the part instead.

Synopsis
The film is set in Tyrol, western Austria. Previously filmed in 1928, the sentimental Margaret Kennedy novel The Constant Nymph was sumptuously remade by Gaumont-British Picture Corporation in 1933. Victoria Hopper plays the title character, a rich, Belgian gamine named Tessa Sanger. The girl falls hopelessly in love with world-famous composer Lewis Dodd (Brian Aherne), who is so full of himself that he barely acknowledges Tessa's existence. As she looks on in quiet desperation, Dodd marries another woman, her cousin Florence (Leonora Corbett). It takes him nearly the entire picture to realize what a fool he's been, and that Tessa was the one girl for him all along—but alas, it's too late. The Constant Nymph was remade by Warner Bros. in 1943, at which time all prints of the 1933 version were supposed to be destroyed, however, several prints did survive.

Cast

References

Bibliography
 Sweet, Matthew. Shepperton Babylon: The Lost Worlds of British Cinema. Faber and Faber, 2005.

External links
 
 
 
 

1933 films
1933 drama films
Films based on British novels
Films directed by Basil Dean
British drama films
Gainsborough Pictures films
Fox Film films
British black-and-white films
1930s English-language films
1930s American films
1930s British films